Fareedi or Faridi, is a clan of the Farooqi tribe named after Farīduddīn Mas'ūd Ganjshakar, a murid of a sheikh who belongs to the sufi order of Baba Fareed Shaker Gunj.

Origin 
Descendants of Farīduddīn Mas'ūd Ganjshakar, the Sufi Saint of Pak Patan in Pakistan. Most Fareedis live in Pakistan while some have moved to what is India now, mostly in the province of Uttar Pradesh, basically Badayun region. From there some moved forward to Bangladesh.

Most Fareedis carry the name Farooqi but some carry the name Fareedi or Faridi. Some even carry the name Masudi or Masoodi. Those in charge of Farid's carry the title Diwan in addition to the name Farooqi.

Fareedis or Faridi in South India 
During the early days of the State of Hyderabad, the Fareedis came to Kannahar which was later named Kandahar after the conquest by Nizam's army which included Pethans from Kandahar. The Nizam appointed them judges, ombudsmen, and aldermen due to their ancestry with Caliph Umer Bin Khattab who was known as Farooq for his judgement. These judges were based in Parbhani but were spread in neighboring areas of Bhoker, Basmatnagar, and Palam. A detailed history can be found in the royal Nizam archives and the books "Mashaheer-e-Qandhar" (Nobles of Kandahar) and "Khandan-e-Beed" (Families of Beed).

Fictional character Fareedi 
Famous Urdu crime fiction novelist Ibn-e-Safi created a character called Ahmad Kamal Faridi which became very popular in the second half of twentieth century among Urdu readership. However Ibn-e-Safi shows him as an Afridi and also a descendant of Genghis Khan. Afridis are Pashtuns in the tribal areas of Khyber Pakhtunkhwa province in Pakistan while Fareedis claim their lineage of Caliph Umar.

See also
 Shaikh of Uttar Pradesh
 Chishti
 Sufism
 Fariduddin Masood Ganjshakar
 Faridia Islamic University
 Abdul Haque Faridi

External links 
 Faridia Islamic University

Fareedi
Surnames
Shaikh clans
Muslim communities of India
Muslim communities of Uttar Pradesh
Social groups of Uttar Pradesh